Volosovo is a rural locality (a village) in Nikolskoye Rural Settlement, Ust-Kubinsky District, Vologda Oblast, Russia. The population was 20 as of 2002.

Geography 
Volosovo is located 30 km northwest of Ustye (the district's administrative centre) by road. Syanino is the nearest rural locality.

References 

Rural localities in Ust-Kubinsky District